Andrew Anderson is an American businessman and politician who served as a member West Virginia House of Delegates from the 35th district. He was appointed by Jim Justice on August 19, 2022. In the 2022 House of Delegates election to the 56th district, Anderson lost in a narrow race to Democrat Kayla Young.

References 

Republican Party members of the West Virginia House of Delegates
Politicians from Charleston, West Virginia
West Virginia University alumni
Living people
Year of birth missing (living people)
People from Cross Lanes, West Virginia
21st-century American politicians